Gene Keliikuli (born June 24, 1943) is a Canadian football player who played for the Edmonton Eskimos.

References

Living people
1943 births
Edmonton Elks players